Hans Cornelis (born 13 October 1982) is a Belgian professional football manager and former player who is the head coach of Belgian Division 2 club Lokeren-Temse.

Playing career
Cornelis was part of a last minute transfer deal in the late evening of 31 August 2009. Cercle Brugge and Genk came to an extensive agreement: Cornelis was sold to Cercle Brugge, his teammate Jelle Vossen joined him on loan. Thomas Buffel made the opposite move.

Following a trial at Notts County, Cornelis joined Deinze for the 2015–16 season.

Managerial career
After having played for lower league club Zwevezele from 2017, Cornelis took over as player-coach in 2019. One year later, he retired from playing football and continued as the team's manager.

After Zwevezele withdrew from the national competitions after the 2021–22 season, Cornelis was appointed new head coach of Belgian Division 2 club Lokeren-Temse on 4 June 2022.

Honours
Club Brugge
 Belgian First Division A: 2002–03, 2004–05
 Belgian Cup: 2001–02, 2003–04
 Belgian Super Cup: 2002, 2003, 2004

Genk
 Belgian Cup: 2008–09

References

External links
 
 

1982 births
Living people
People from Eeklo
Belgian footballers
Footballers from East Flanders
Association football defenders
Belgian Pro League players
Challenger Pro League players
Club Brugge KV players
K.R.C. Genk players
Cercle Brugge K.S.V. players
K.M.S.K. Deinze players
K.S.K. Voorwaarts Zwevezele players
Belgian football managers